Dahlbäck may refer to:

Björn Dahlbäck (born 1949), Swedish physician and medical researcher
Jesper Dahlbäck (born 1974), Swedish music producer and DJ
John Dahlbäck (born 1985), Swedish music producer and DJ
Helena Dahlbäck (1960–2000), Swedish children's book author
Herman Dahlbäck (1891–1968), Swedish Olympic rower